Itkineyevo (Etkenä) is a rural locality (a selo) and the administrative centre of Itkineyevsky Selsoviet, Yanaulsky District, Bashkortostan, Russia. The population was 675 as of 2010. There are 10 streets.

Geography 
Itkineyevo is located 7 km south of Yanaul (the district's administrative centre) by road. Shudimari is the nearest rural locality.

References 

Rural localities in Yanaulsky District